In the female human body, the clitoral hood (also called preputium clitoridis and clitoral prepuce) is a fold of skin that surrounds and protects the glans of the clitoris; it also covers the external shaft of the clitoris, develops as part of the labia minora and is homologous with the foreskin (also called the prepuce) in the male reproductive system.
The clitoral hood is composed of mucocutaneous tissues; these tissues are between the mucous membrane and the skin, and they may have immunological importance because they may be a point of entry of mucosal vaccines. The clitoral hood is also important not only in the protection of the clitoral glans, but also in pleasure, as its tissue forms part of the erogenous zones of the vulva.

Development and variation
The clitoral hood is formed during the fetal stage by the cellular lamella. The cellular lamella grows down on the dorsal side of the clitoris and is eventually fused with the clitoris. The clitoral hood is formed from the same tissues that form the foreskin in human males.

The clitoral hood varies in the size, shape, thickness, and other aesthetic aspects. Some women have large clitoral hoods that completely cover the clitoral glans. Some of these can be retracted to expose the clitoral glans, such as for hygiene purposes or for pleasure; others do not retract. Other women have smaller hoods that do not cover the full length of the clitoral glans, leaving the clitoral glans exposed all the time. Sticky bands of tissue called adhesions can form between the hood and the glans; these stick the hood onto the glans so the hood cannot be pulled back to expose the glans, and, as in the male, strongly scented smegma can accumulate.

Stimulation

Normally, the clitoral glans itself is too sensitive to be stimulated directly, such as in cases where the hood is retracted. Women with hoods covering most of the clitoral glans can often masturbate by stimulating the hood over the clitoral glans; those with smaller, or more compact, structures tend to rub the clitoral glans and hood together.

The clitoral hood additionally provides protection to the clitoral glans, like foreskin on the penile glans. During sexual stimulation, the hood may also prevent the penis from coming into direct contact with the glans clitoridis, which is usually stimulated by the pressure of the partners' pubis.

Most mammals and primates approach copulation from the rear instead of the common frontal position that humans often assume, so the clitoral stimulation is directly created by glans contact with the scrotum at the base of the penis and the different contractions of its corrugated dartos muscles. The clitoral glans, like the foreskin, must be lubricated by the naturally provided sebum. If the clitoral glans is not lubricated, the hood may not properly stimulate it during sexual activity, and it may cause pain.

Modifications

In most of the world, clitoral modifications are uncommon. In some cultures, female genital mutilation (FGM) is practiced as a rite of passage into womanhood, is perceived as an improvement to the appearance of the genitalia, or is used to suppress or reduce female sexual desire and pleasure (including masturbation). FGM was performed on many children in Western countries, including previously in the United States, to discourage masturbation and reduce diseases believed to relate to it.

One modification that women sometimes perform of their free will is to have the hood pierced and insert jewelry, both for adornment and physical pleasure. Though less common, other women opt to have their own hood surgically trimmed or removed so as to permanently expose part or all of the clitoral glans.

See also
Frenulum clitoridis (or crus glandis clitoridis): a frenulum surrounding the clitoris
Preputial sheath (disambiguation)

References

External links
  - "The Female Perineum: The Vulva"

Hood